Henryk Pielesiak (9 August 1955 – 25 October 2005) was a Polish boxer. He competed in the men's light flyweight event at the 1980 Summer Olympics. At the 1980 Summer Olympics, he lost to Ri Byong-uk of North Korea.

References

1955 births
2005 deaths
Polish male boxers
Olympic boxers of Poland
Boxers at the 1980 Summer Olympics
Sportspeople from Łódź
Light-flyweight boxers